The 2003 Kerry Senior Football Championship was the 103rd staging of the Kerry Senior Football Championship since its establishment by the Kerry County Board in 1889.

Kerins O'Rahilly's entered the championship as the defending champions, however, they were beaten by Mid Kerry in the quarter-finals.

The final replay was played on 26 October 2003 at Austin Stack Park in Tralee, between An Ghaeltacht and Laune Rangers. An Ghaeltacht won the match by 0-12 to 2-04 to claim their second championship title overall and a first title in two years.

Mid Kerry's Kieran Foley was the championship's top scorer with 1-22.

Team changes

To Championship

Promoted from the Kerry Intermediate Football Championship
 Listowel Emmets

From Championship

Relegated to the Kerry Intermediate Football Championship
 Killarney Legion

Club section

Club round 1

Club round 1 losers' round

Relegation playoff

Division section

Division round 1

Division round 1 losers' group

Division round 2

Division round 2 losers' group

Knockout stage

Round 3

Quarter-finals

Semi-finals

Final

Championship statistics

Top scorers

Overall

In a single game

Miscellaneous

 Laune Rangers qualified for the final for the first time since 1997.
 The final went to a replay for the first time since 1997.
 Listowel Emmets made their first  appearance in the senior championship since 1984.

References

Kerry Senior Football Championship
2003 in Gaelic football